Saas Bhi Kabhi Bahu Thi is a 1970 Indian Hindi film starring Sanjay Khan, Leena Chandavarkar, Om Prakash, and Jagdeep among others. It deals with the relationship between mothers-in-law and their daughters-in-law. The film was a remake of Telugu film Atha Okinti Kodale.

Plot
Pretty Sadhana, the daughter of Rangpur-based widow, Bhagmati, falls in love, and marries Haripur-based Deepak Chaudhary, who lives with his dad, Motilal; and mom, Maya. It is here she will find that her mom expects her to abuse Maya, and drive her out; while Bhagmati herself abuses her very own daughter-in-law, Lajwanti, for not bringing any dowry, and prevents her submissive son, Kanhaiya, from being intimate with her. Sadhana will also find out why Motilal and Maya do not converse with each other directly, and why the former keeps a photo-less frame in the main living room of their mansion.

Cast
Sanjay as Deelap 'Deepu' M. Chaudhary (as Sanjay)
Leena Chandavarkar as Sadhana D. Chaudhary
Om Prakash as Motilal Chaudhary
Jagdeep as Kanhaiya
Lalita Pawar as Bhagmati
Shashikala as Maya M. Chaudhary
Anupama (actress, fl. 1969-1982)|Anupama as Lajwanti 'Laajo'
Manmohan Krishna as Chamanlal (as Man Mohan Krishna)    
Pratima Devi (Hindi actress)|Pratima Devi as Lakshmi Chaudhary
N. S. Bedi as Shevakram 
Sunder (actor)|Sunder as Gobind (as Sundar)

Soundtrack 
The soundtrack was composed by R. D. Burman.

References

External links 

1970 films
1970s Hindi-language films
Hindi remakes of Telugu films
Films directed by V. Madhusudhana Rao
Films scored by R. D. Burman